It Must Be Christmas is the sixth studio album and first Christmas album by American country music artist Chris Young. It was released on October 14, 2016, by Columbia. Young co-wrote two of the album's ten tracks.

Reception

Critical
Stephen Thomas Erlewine of AllMusic rated the album three stars out of five. "[It] does everything a modern mainstream holiday album should do," writes Erlewine, "it plays upon memories of Christmas while appealing to the moment at hand." He added that the original songs "feel like radio tunes" rather than seasonal material. Chuck Dauphin of country music blog Sounds Like Nashville wrote a positive review in which he praised Young's "classic approach" to the holiday fare. "Whether it be a "New" classic or an evergreen one," he writes, "Young hits all the right notes on the album."

Commercial
Upon release, It Must Be Christmas debuted in the top five of the Billboard Top Country Albums chart at number four and also topped the Holiday Albums chart.  The album has sold 74,100 copies in the US as of November 2017.

Track listing

Personnel
Boyz II Men - vocals on "Silent Night"
Joshua Carter - string arrangements, strings
Dave Cohen - Hammond B-3 organ, piano, synthesizer
Corey Crowder - programming, background vocals
Alan Jackson - vocals on "There's a New Kid in Town"
Tony Lucido - bass guitar
Miles McPherson - drums, percussion
Carl Miner - acoustic guitar
Brad Paisley - electric guitar and vocals on "The First Noel"
Kristen Rogers - background vocals
Derek Wells - electric guitar
Chris Young - lead vocals, background vocals

Charts

Weekly charts

Year-end charts

References

2016 Christmas albums
Chris Young (musician) albums
Country Christmas albums
RCA Records albums